is an anime science fiction series. It inspired an OVA sequel series called Orguss 02. Orguss was the second part of The Super Dimension trilogy from Big West, preceded by The Super Dimension Fortress Macross and followed by The Super Dimension Cavalry Southern Cross.

Orguss was the second "Super Dimension" series (after Macross and before Southern Cross), but other than the descriptive name, these three series are not sequels, prequels, or even in the same story universe as one another. Their only connection is the "Super Dimension" moniker in their titles presented by Big West. Despite rumors to the contrary, Orguss was never selected to be part of Robotech.

Of the Orguss''' 35 episodes, only 17 were available in English. They were available in dub-only format in the early 1990s on video tape from U.S. Renditions, before the majority of the company's shows (excluding Orguss) were bought up by Manga Entertainment. Manga Entertainment released Orguss 02 on both video tape and DVD.

On April 16, 2007, ImaginAsian announced that they would broadcast Super Dimension Century Orguss on ImaginAsian TV, and would thereafter give the series its first complete North American DVD release. The first 17 episodes would also have the old U.S. rendition dub, but due to lack of sales, the program was discontinued. Discotek Media has since licensed the series for a DVD re-release in 2015. Discotek released Orguss on DVD on September 29, 2015, including the dub episodes. On September 28, 2021, Discotek released the complete 35-episode TV series on Blu-ray in North America.

Basic synopsis

The year is 2062, and the world is at war. The two superpowers clash over the space elevator. Far more dangerous than atomic, biological, or chemical weapons are dimensional weapons, such as the Space/Time Oscillation Bomb. Despite the tremendous power of this bomb, it must be armed on-site by a team of engineers.

Desperately, the Freedom Space Corps launch an offensive to plant a Space/Time Oscillation Bomb and destroy the space elevator. During this attack, the engineers are forced to abort the mission and destroy the bomb before it can be properly armed. Enraged at the decision to abort and feeling that his comrades have died in vain, brash fighter pilot Kei Katsuragi haphazardly arms the bomb with severe repercussions.

A dimensional explosion transports Kei and his Bronco II variable fighter to a severely damaged future. There he is pursued for unknown reasons by the militaristic Chilam and aided by the Gypsie-like Emaan. Originally translated by US Renditions as "Differentiated Idioblast", it is more properly translated as "Singularity". In the ImaginAsian version, it has been translated as an "Idiosyncratic Point". After Kei's Bronco II is damaged during a fight the Emaan modify it into the Orguss, the eponymous mecha from the series, which was later adopted and mass-produced as the Orguss II.

Characters

Crew of the Glomar

Second Lieutenant of the Freedom Space Corps. Age 20. He was assigned a mission to escort and provide cover to a group of engineers who were arming the Space/Time Oscillation Bomb in order to destroy the Space Elevator. When circumstances force the mission to abort, Kei decides to properly arm the Space/Time Oscillation Bomb himself. This results in Kei being transported 20 years into the future, where he is found by a group of tradesfolk from Emaan, believing him to be the Singularity. Aside from being a formidable pilot, Kei is also a womanizer, having several different girlfriends which he dates alternately before he met the Emaans, in which he begins a new romantic relationship with Mimsy. Even in his relationship with Mimsy, Kei still tends to flirt with any other woman that catches his eye.

A 16-year-old Emaan girl. In the Glomar, she serves as the Vice-Captain and provides battle info and tactics. Her interest in Kei is, at first, because he is the Singularity. This means that she has been given orders by her family to return him to the Emaan country. As the series progresses, she begins to develop romantic feelings for Kei, even though she is engaged to Slay. Mimsy also acts as Kei's guide in learning the culture of the Emaans. Her family, along with Shaya's family, runs the Emaan country.

Captain of the Glomar, she is also the head supervisor in the ship's marketing business as well as the Chief Operator of the Glomar's controls. Upon discovering Kei as a Singularity by Jabby, she is given orders to deliver Kei to the Emaan homeland as soon as possible. Shaya follows faithfully the Emaan customs and culture. Among those customs are dressing and taking baths even with men present and never being shy about it, which gives Kei an uncomfortable position of being a pervert when he and Shaya are together. This is because of the Emaan's biological nature. Emaan women lose their fertility at age 18, at which point they are no longer courted by Emaan men and are considered no longer as 'females'. Her family, along with Mimsy's family, runs the Emaan country.

An android in the appearance of a little girl whom Kei bought from a small village. Her primary program is to faithfully serve the person who bought her, which in this case, was Kei. She is from the Mu race, a civilization known for its advanced machinery. Having a sophisticated AI, Mome possesses a variety of skills from cooking to nursing to repairing the Orguss with ease. Despite being an android, Mome is capable of expressing emotion and openly expresses her love for Kei and dreaming to be his wife.

A dragon-like talking creature of the Glomar crew who came from an alternate Earth. Jabby appears having brown skin, large hind legs, long arms with three fingers, a tail, and a long neck. Jabby's tail is capable of detecting any dimensional activity nearby and thus allows him to sense Kei as a Singularity. It was him that proposed the name "Orguss" on Kei's newly built unit, named after the war god of his world.

Mimsy's fiancé. Slay serves as the secondary operator of the Glomar whenever Shaya takes a break or if the ship is not on auto-pilot. Slay highly dislikes Kei, blaming him for all the trouble and loss of the Glomar's crewmembers from the Chilam because of his status as a Tokuiten. Slay also dislikes Kei for forming a romantic relationship with Mimsy, making them rivals for her affections.

Twin sisters and the only members of the Glomar crew who are fighter pilots, aside from Kei. They control the Drifant-type ships M.Lover Maaie and Lieea respectively.

The oldest member of the Glomar crew. His primary role in the ship is to negotiate with customers, persuading them to purchase whatever items the Glomar is selling. When asking for the name of Kei's newly built unit, he proposed the name 'Gamon'. He forms a close relationship with Kei.

Chief Engineer of the Glomar who oversaw the building of the Orguss. Like Slay, Leeg blames Kei for the Chiram's attempt to pursure the Glomar and the death of some of its crewmembers. However, upon learning of Kei's role as a Singularity, he accepts him as part of the crew.

Papty is a mother of two Emaan children and is often seen raising them. Her husband is killed in the first Chiram attack on the Glomar. When she is not raising her children, she works by providing maintenance and repairs to the Orguss and the Glomar. In one episode, she is seen putting her two children to sleep while simultaneously firing the Glomar's Machine Guns against enemy units.

A Mu fighting robot. Taii's remains were recovered and later rebuilt by Mome. Taii has a personality of an old veteran soldier and strictly observes the combat tactics in his programming, which makes him a nuisance to most of the crew. Taii is equipped with multiple missiles in his chest that gives him enough firepower to destroy a Chiram unit. His name means "Captain" in Japanese.

The Chirams

Captain of the Chiram Army. Upon learning of the Singularity's appearance, he begins his campaign to capture Kei, but fails due to Kei's ability as a pilot and his Orguss. Roberto's repeated failures result with the Chiram assigning someone else to capture Kei, and putting his rank in jeopardy. This drives Roberto to capture Kei by any means necessary.

Lieutenant of the Chiram Army and Roberto's right-hand man.

Ace pilot of the Chiram and Kei's rival in combat. Age 20. Her skills as a fighter pilot equally match those of Kei's thanks to her intensive training from her mentor, Orson D. Verne. She has made it her personal goal to defeat Kei and deliver him to the Chiram. Unbeknownest to her, Kei is actually her biological father and Tina is her biological mother.

Kei's best friend and Wingman in the Freedom Space Corps. He and Kei were together during the mission to destroy the Space Elevator. Like Kei, Orson was sent to the future. Upon his arrival, he met Tina and promised her that he will find Kei. Orson then joined the Chiram army and was assigned to pursue the Singularity, which he did not know was Kei himself. It is revealed that Orson is the second Singularity and that he and Kei are needed to restore the different worlds back to their former state. He also trained Athena in becoming the Chiram's ace pilot. This character's name was created as a tribute to actor/director Orson Welles and science fiction writer Jules Verne.

Leader of the Chiram. Determined to save his people, he ordered his army to hunt down and capture the Singularity. He also ordered his engineers to develop a device as an alternative to the Singularity should his army fail. Jeffrey's goal is to restore the Chiram world and its people back to its former state, even at the expense of the other worlds and its inhabitants. This not only puts the Chiram at war with the Emaans, but also with the Mu race.

Other characters

Kei's girlfriend before the explosion of the Space/Time Oscillation Bomb. Tina was pregnant with Kei's child before Kei was sent to the future. 15 years later after the Space/Time Oscillation Bomb exploded, a terminally ill Tina was met by Orson, who promises her he will find Kei. She died before Kei's reappearance 5 years later.

Shaia's twin sister. She is a member of the Thoov family that runs the Emaan country and orders the capture of Kei to restore the Emaan world by any means necessary, even if it means destroying the Glomar and its crew.

Leader of a rebel group aiding the Glomar Crew. Jeanne's home country, which is a dominant female society, was under the oppression of its ruler, Queen Marie, and requested the Glomar crew for aid. After Jeanne's country is freed from Marie's control, she provided sanctuary to the Glomar crew from their pursuers. It was Jeanne's appearance that gave clues to Kei about the different worlds of Earth being merged as one. Jeanne is loosely based on the national hero of France, Joan d'Arc while Queen Marie is loosely based on Marie Antoinette.

Production
Original Story: Studio Nue
Direction: Noburo Ishiguro and Yasuyoshi Mikamoto
Character Design: Haruhiko Mikimoto
Mechanical Design: Kazutaka Miyatake
Art Direction: Yoshiyuki Yamamoto
Director of Photography: Masahide Ueda
Music: Kentaro Haneda and Casey RankinChoujikuu Seiki Orguss OST, 1983. 1995 Edition.
Opening/Ending Theme:  / 
Lyricist: Miura Kousuke
Composer / Arranger / Singer: Casey Rankin
Music Direction: Seiji Suzuki
Producer: Toshitsuga Mukaitsubo
Executive Producers: Yutaka Fujioka and Yoshimasa Onishi

Episode list

Orguss 02
 is a 6-episode anime OVA released in 1993 as a sequel to the Orguss TV series. It was released on DVD in the US and UK by Manga Entertainment.

Taking place 200 years after the story of Orguss, the OVA deals with an early industrial society finding advanced mecha weapons called Armors (referred to in Manga's translation as "Decimators") and how they are now used as tools of war. The story focuses on the question of why these mecha are present in this world, where they came from and the history surrounding them.

Main characters

Decimators

OVA episode list

Video games
A shoot 'em up game based on the original TV series was released in 1984 for the Sega SG-1000 game console in Japan and Europe.

This series is also included in the PlayStation 2 game Super Robot Wars Z released in 2008. In this game the plot of Orguss plays a central role, as it is the detonation of the Space-Time Oscillation Bomb (an event dubbed "Break the World") that unites the heroes, villains, and locales from the various anime featured in the game. Kei and Athena return in the game's sequel, Z2.

The dimensional phenomena stemming from the Space-Time Oscillation Bomb were eventually resolved in the final game of Z series, using three "Singularities" (Kei, Orson, and Xine, an original character that was also present at the detonation of the Space-Time Oscillation Bomb). This resulted in the various dimensions returning to their proper places. Kei also got the honor of saying the last voiced line of the Super Robot War Z series: 
"This will end everything,...! And, it is the beginning of multiple new worlds!!"

This series also appears in the 2010 videogame Another Century's Episode: R for the PlayStation 3.

Macross cameo
A mecha from the Orguss series can be seen fighting alongside other Macross Destroids in front of the bridge of the SDF-1 Macross in the last episode of Television version of The Super Dimension Fortress Macross. The mecha in question was Kei's Orguss which was shown holding a shield and a rifle in the other arm for a moment before being shattered by incoming enemy fire.

In episode 2 of Orguss'', several Macross characters make appearances. Minmay, Shammy, and Vanessa are shown at 15:16 as the main character recalls past girlfriends. Misa Hayase briefly appears on the monitor of the alien fighter as it turns on at 20:28 among other images of apparent static. The image of Misa on the monitor is shown to not be wearing clothes.

In episode 18, there is a storage crate on the Guruma merchant ship marked “Valkyrie VF-1J”.

In episode 34, the SDF-1 in attack mode appears in a battle scene at the space elevator.

References

External links
Orguss at Gears Online
Orguss 02 at Gears Online
 
 
Orguss Viewer's Guide

1983 anime television series debuts
1993 anime OVAs
Artland (company)
Discotek Media
J.C.Staff
Mainichi Broadcasting System original programming
Mecha anime and manga
Super Dimension
Television series set in the 2060s
TMS Entertainment